Aranidipine (INN, trade name Sapresta) is a calcium channel blocker. It is a dihydropyridine derivative with two active metabolites (M-1α and M-1β). It was developed by Maruko Seiyaku and has the formula methyl 2-oxopropyl 1,4-dihydro-2,6-dimethyl-4-(2-nitrophenyl)-3,5-pyridinedicarboxylate. Its main use is as a hypotensive, reducing blood pressure.

References

Calcium channel blockers
Dihydropyridines
Carboxylate esters
Ketones
Nitrobenzenes
Methyl esters